Lurín may refer to the following places in Lima Province, Peru:
 Roman Catholic Diocese of Lurín
 Lurín District
 Lurín River

See also
 Lurin, a quartier of Saint Barthélemy in the Caribbean